The 2019 Sparkassen Open was a professional tennis tournament played on clay courts. It was the 26th edition of the tournament which was part of the 2019 ATP Challenger Tour. It took place in Braunschweig, Germany between 8 and 13 July 2019.

Singles main-draw entrants

Seeds

 1 Rankings are as of 1 July 2019.

Other entrants
The following players received wildcards into the singles main draw:
  Daniel Altmaier
  Johannes Härteis
  Julian Lenz
  Daniel Masur
  Cedrik-Marcel Stebe

The following players received entry into the singles main draw as alternates:
  Gonzalo Escobar
  Benjamin Hassan
  Renzo Olivo

The following players received entry into the singles main draw using their ITF World Tennis Ranking:
  Javier Barranco Cosano
  Peter Heller
  Karim-Mohamed Maamoun
  Botic van de Zandschulp
  Tim van Rijthoven

The following players received entry from the qualifying draw:
  Geoffrey Blancaneaux
  Niklas Guttau

The following player received entry as a lucky loser:
  Emil Ruusuvuori

Champions

Singles

  Thiago Monteiro def.  Tobias Kamke 7–6(8–6), 6–1.

Doubles

  Simone Bolelli /  Guillermo Durán def.  Nathaniel Lammons /  Antonio Šančić 6–3, 6–2.

External links
Official Website

2019 ATP Challenger Tour
2019
2019 in German tennis
July 2019 sports events in Germany